Ricardo Gonzales may refer to:

Ricardo Babs Gonzales
Ricardo Gonzales (boxer), see Boxing at the 1951 Pan American Games

See also
Ricardo Gonzalez (disambiguation)